The 2014–15 Plunket Shield was the 86th season of official first-class cricket in New Zealand. The competition started on 23 October 2014, and finished on 3 April 2015. Canterbury won the tournament for the eighteenth time after a victory against Northern Districts in the final round of matches.

Teams

Points Distribution 

Batting Bonus Points are awarded in relation to the number of runs scored after 110 overs are bowled in the first innings.

Bowling Bonus Points are awarded in relation to the number of wickets taken after 110 overs are bowled in the first innings.

Points Table

References

External links
 Series home at ESPN Cricinfo

Plunket Shield
2014–15 New Zealand cricket season
Plunket Shield